During the 1999–2000 English football season, Bradford City competed in the FA Premier League.

Season summary
David Wetherall's goal on the final day of the season gave Bradford City a surprise 1–0 victory over Liverpool, which secured survival and kept them in the top division that the Bantams had spent 77 years trying to regain. Paul Jewell then walked out at Valley Parade to take over at relegated Sheffield Wednesday, leaving his assistant Chris Hutchings to pick up the pieces.

Final league table

Results summary

Results by round

Results
Bradford City's score comes first

Legend

FA Premier League

FA Cup

League Cup

First-team squad
Squad at end of season

Left club during season

Transfers

In

Out

Transfers in:  £2,850,000
Transfers out:  £827,500
Total spending:  £2,022,500

Statistics

Starting 11
Considering starts in all competitions
 GK: #13,  Matt Clarke, 24
 RB: #18,  Gunnar Halle, 40
 CB: #14,  Andy O'Brien, 40
 CB: #5,  David Wetherall, 41
 LB: #22,  Wayne Jacobs, 23
 RM: #7,  Jamie Lawrence, 20 (#8,  Robbie Blake, has 19 starts)
 CM: #4,  Stuart McCall, 36
 CM: #10,  Gareth Whalley, 18
 LM: #11,  Peter Beagrie, 34
 CF: #28, Dean Saunders, 30 (#9,  Lee Mills, has 22 starts)
 CF: #15,  Dean Windass, 40

Notes

References

Bradford City A.F.C. seasons
Bradford City